Edge of Heaven is a British sitcom centred on a 1980s-themed guest house in Margate. The show is produced by Hartswood Films for ITV and began airing on 21 February 2014 for six episodes. In March and April it was repeated on Thursday nights.

On 5 May 2014 it was confirmed that, due to disappointing ratings, ITV would not be commissioning a second series of the sitcom. Talking to local media, executive producer Beryl Vertue said: "We had a very tough programming slot and were up against popular shows such as Sport’s Relief on the BBC. We had such a great time making the show and the sad thing is everyone at ITV loved it but unfortunately the ratings meant we couldn’t continue for a second series."

Overview
The show is centred on Edge of Heaven, a 1980s-themed bed and breakfast in Margate. Alfie is jilted at the altar by his fiancée Carly. His family and friends try to help Alfie deal with the aftermath and emotions.

Cast and characters

These are main and recurring cast and characters in Edge of Heaven.

Blake Harrison as Alfie – a groom jilted at the altar by Carly.
Camille Coduri as Judy – co-owner of the Edge of Heaven B&B, wife of Tandeep, mother of Alfie and Ann-Marie.
Marcia Warren as Nanny Mo – a pensioner, mother of Judy and Bald Gary.
Adrian Scarborough as Bald Gary – son of Nanny Mo, brother of Judy, husband of Camp Gary.
Justine Michelle Cain as Carly – the bride who leaves Alfie at the altar.
Louisa Lytton as Michelle – Carly's best friend, Alfie's unrequited love.
Robert Evans as Camp Gary – husband of Bald Gary.
Nitin Kundra as Tandeep – co-owner and chef at the Edge of Heaven B&B, husband of Judy, stepfather of Alfie and Ann-Marie.
Laura Checkley as Ann-Marie – a demobbed soldier now working at her family's B&B, sister of Alfie, daughter of Judy.
Nav Sidhu as Donkey – one of Alfie's best friends.
Raphael Sowole as Spanner – one of Alfie's best friends.
Rufus Jones as Prop Maartie – Alfie's boss at Sofa World.
Michael Smiley as Snowy – Alfie's ne'er-do-well, oft-absent biological father.

Filming Locations
The series was set in Margate in Kent, with the beach, high street and seafront featuring throughout the series, and the BNB exterior was actually filmed on Albert Terrace. Broadstairs was also used for some filming locations, such as Morelli's Ice Cream Parlour.

Episode Guide

Reception 

With 2.7 million viewers, Edge of Heaven gave ITV its smallest ever audience for a first episode of a new scripted series airing at 9pm.

Sam Wollaston of The Guardian described Edge of Heaven as "limp" and "super lameness" despite excellent recent work by stars Blake Harrison and Camille Coduri. However, "Margate...looks lovely." Further commentary from The Guardian stated, "A bit like Margate itself, perhaps, this feels unlikely to improve anytime soon" (John Robinson) and the "comedy pootles on amusingly, but plays it far too safe to ever broach real hilarity" (Rachel Aroesti).

Ed Power of The Telegraph cited outdated, retro humour. He said that "the story felt thinner than onion skin". Despite the "smoking wreckage, it nonetheless kept you glued". "Between the winks, nudges and groans an unexpected sweetness bubbled to the surface", Power stated. The show's "heart was in the right place." He praises the "likable...ragamuffin characters".

References

External links
 
 

2010s British sitcoms
2014 British television series debuts
2014 British television series endings
English-language television shows
2010s British television miniseries
ITV sitcoms
Margate
Television series by Hartswood Films
Television shows set in Kent
Television shows shot in Kent